Fakhr Avari (also Romanized as Fakhr Āvarī and Fakhr Averi; also known as Fahrīār and Fahriyāri) is a village in Hayat Davud Rural District, in the Central District of Ganaveh County, Bushehr Province, Iran. At the 2006 census, its population was 413, in 91 families.

References 

Populated places in Ganaveh County